Mount Bracey, is a  mountain in the Miscinchinka Ranges of the Hart Ranges in the Northern Rocky Mountains.

Named after Canadian Army Corporal Charles William Bracey, from South Fort George, BC; serving with 4th Armoured Brigade, 4th Canadian (Armoured) Division, Lake Superior Regiment (Motor), R.C.I.C. when he was killed in action 15 August 1944, age 23 during Operation Tractable, in Normandy.. Cpl Bracey is buried at Hottot-les-Bagues War Cemetery, Calvados, France, grave III. A. 5.

Reference 

Northern Interior of British Columbia
One-thousanders of British Columbia
Canadian Rockies
Cariboo Land District